An Díbirt go Connachta is a lament attributed to Feardorcha Ó Mealláin who is claimed as staraí Éirí amach 1641/the historian of the 1641 Rising, Tarlach Ó Mealláin.

It is a lament in Irish inspired by the proposed scheme of the early 1650s to transplant the 'delinquent' Irish to Connacht.

References
 Séan de Fréine (ed.) 'Croí Cine' (Baile Átha Cliath, 1999), p. 331.
 Enri Ó Muirgheasa (ed.), 'Dánta Diagra Uladh' (Baile Átha Cliath, 1926).
 Breandan Ó Buachalla et al., (eds.) 'Nua-Dhuanaire, i' (Dublin, 1971).

17th century in Ireland
Irish-language literature
Irish poems